Durham Smythe (born August 9, 1995) is an American football tight end for the Miami Dolphins of the National Football League (NFL). He played college football at Notre Dame.

Early years
Smythe attended and played high school football at Belton High School.

College career
Smythe attended and played college football at Notre Dame. He totaled 28 receptions for 381 receiving yards and six receiving touchdowns in four years.

Professional career

Smythe was drafted by the Miami Dolphins in the fourth round with the 123rd overall pick in the 2018 NFL Draft, using the pick acquired from Cleveland in the Jarvis Landry trade. He made his NFL debut in Week 1 of the 2018 season against the Tennessee Titans. He recorded his first two career receptions in Week 12 against the Indianapolis Colts. In the 2018 season, he totaled six receptions for 50 receiving yards.

In the 2019 season, Smythe appeared in all 16 games, of which he started 14. He finished with seven receptions for 65 receiving yards.

In Week 6 of the 2020 season, he scored his first professional touchdown on a four-yard reception against the New York Jets.

On March 22, 2022, Smythe re-signed with the Dolphins on a two-year contract.

References

External links
Miami Dolphins bio
 Notre Dame Fighting Irish bio

1995 births
Living people
American football tight ends
Miami Dolphins players
Notre Dame Fighting Irish football players
People from Bell County, Texas
Players of American football from Texas
Sportspeople from Delaware County, Pennsylvania
Players of American football from Pennsylvania